Jost Raba ( 17 August 1900 – 12 February 2000) was a German violinist and music educator.

Life 
Raba was born in 1900 as the son of a sales representative and his wife in Freising. He attended high school in Augsburg and studied at the Ludwig Maximilian University of Munich. From 1917 to 1920 he was taught by Johann Slunicko in Augsburg. From 1920 to 1925, he studied violin with Alexander Petschnikoff and Felix Berber at the University of Music and Performing Arts Munich.

Danach wurde er Lehrer für Violine und chamber music am Städtischen Konservatorium in Augsburg. Außerdem war er solistisch und kammermusikalisch tätig, among others with the Raba Quartet (1924–1934) and in the Strub Quartet (1934–1938). From 1932 to 1935 he worked freelance. In 1935 he became 1st concertmaster with the orchestra of the Deutschlandsender. In 1942 he took over a full-time teaching position or professorship at the Universität der Künste Berlin. In 1946 he took over a professorship at the Staatliche Hochschule für Musik Munich. His students included Willi Leininger among others.

Raba, a Roman Catholic, was married and lived in Murnau am Staffelsee. His son  (born in 1936) is a photographer.

Writings 
 Fundamentale Violintechnik. Eine Sammlung von Meisteretüden mit Beiträgen aus der Violin-Methodik. edited with Franz Moser. Hieber, Munich 1953.

Further reading 
 Hedwig und Erich Hermann Mueller von Asow (ed.): Kürschners Handbücher deutscher Musiker-Kalender 1954. 2nd edition of the Deutschen Musiker-Lexikons, Walter de Gruyter, Berlin 1954.
 Erich H. Müller (ed.): Deutsches Musiker-Lexikon. W. Limpert-Verlag, Dresden 1929.

References

External links 
 Raba, Jost on BMLO
 

1900 births
2000 deaths
People from Freising
German classical violinists
Male classical violinists
Concertmasters
Academic staff of the University of Music and Performing Arts Munich
Academic staff of the Berlin University of the Arts
20th-century German male musicians